Ivan Loos (March 23, 1878 – February 23, 1956) was an American Major League Baseball pitcher. He played for the Philadelphia Athletics during the  season.

References

Major League Baseball pitchers
Philadelphia Athletics players
Baseball players from Pennsylvania
1878 births
1956 deaths
Jacksonville Jays players
Savannah Indians players
Portsmouth Truckers players
Danville Red Sox players
Ursinus Bears baseball players